"Romeo" is a song written and produced by Dino, featuring a rap by Doctor Ice (of UTFO). The song is the opening track on his second album Swingin' and was issued as the album's first single. It is Dino's biggest hit to date in the United States, peaking at #6 on the Billboard Hot 100 in 1990.

Track listing
All songs written and produced by Dino; all songs feature Doctor Ice except tracks 3 and 5.

 "Romeo" (12” remix) – 5:32
 "Romeo" (Red Zone Mix) – 5:30
 "Romeo" (Instrumental) – 5:15
 "Romeo" (Radio Edit) – 4:10
 "Romeo" (Dub Version) – 4:08
 "Romeo" (Loop A Pella) – 4:18

Charts

Weekly charts

Year-end charts

References

1990 singles
Dino (singer) songs
1990 songs